Edaphus is a genus of beetles belonging to the family Staphylinidae.

The genus has cosmopolitan distribution.

Species:
 Edaphellus novaeguineae Fauvel, 1878 
 Edaphus abdominalis Puthz, 1979

References

Staphylinidae
Staphylinidae genera